Verkhneyaushevo (Ürge Yawış) is a rural locality (a selo) and the administrative centre of Verkhneyaushevsky Selsoviet, Fyodorovsky District, Bashkortostan, Russia. The population was 448 as of 2010. There are 8 streets.

Geography 
Verkhneyaushevo is located 7 km east of Fyodorovka (the district's administrative centre) by road. Gogolevka is the nearest rural locality.

References 

Rural localities in Fyodorovsky District